The 2019 Asian Airgun Championships were held at Gongxi Shooting Range, Taoyuan, Taiwan between 25 March and 2 April 2019.

Medal summary

Men

Women

Mixed

Medal table

See also
 List of sporting events in Taiwan

References 
General
 ISSF Results Overview

Specific

External links 
 Official Results

Asian Shooting Championships
Shooting
Asian